Pettingell is a surname. Notable people with the surname include:

 Frank Pettingell (1891–1966), English actor
 William Pettingell (1914–1987), Australian businessman

See also
 Pettingill